Shazia Kamran (born 8 March 1969) is a Pakistani politician who was a Member of the Provincial Assembly of the Punjab, from May 2013 to May 2018.

Early life and education
She was born on 8 March 1969 in Sahiwal.

She graduated in 1991 from the University of the Punjab and received the degree of Bachelor of Arts.

Political career

She was elected to the Provincial Assembly of the Punjab as a candidate of Pakistan Muslim League (N) on a reserved seat for women in 2013 Pakistani general election.

References

Living people
Women members of the Provincial Assembly of the Punjab
Punjab MPAs 2013–2018
1969 births
Pakistan Muslim League (N) politicians
People from Sahiwal District
21st-century Pakistani women politicians